Live+1 is a 1988 EP by the hard rock band Frehley's Comet. It was meant to serve as a stop-gap until the release of the group's second studio album, Second Sighting.  The first four songs were recorded live at the Aragon Ballroom in Chicago, Illinois, on September 4, 1987. The last song, "Words Are Not Enough," is a shorter version of a demo recording the group made in 1985

Track listing

Personnel
Frehley's Comet
Ace Frehley – guitars, lead and backing vocals
Tod Howarth – guitars, keyboards, lead and backing vocals
John Regan – bass guitar and backing vocals
Anton Fig – drums and percussion

Production
Andy Johns – engineer
Isa Helderman, Kathy Yore, Mark Harder, Timothy R. Powell – assistant engineers
Scott Mabuchi – mixing, producer on track 5
Danny Mormando, Jeff Abigzer – mixing assistants
Eddie Kramer – producer on track 5
Dennis King – mastering

Charts

References

1988 EPs
Ace Frehley live albums
1988 live albums
Live EPs
Megaforce Records EPs